Arthur Vivian Watkins (1886–1973) was a U.S. Senator from Utah from 1947 to 1959. Senator Watkins may also refer to:

G. Harold Watkins (1903–1991), Pennsylvania State Senate
George Watkins (politician) (1902–1970), Pennsylvania State Senate
John B. Watkins (1855–1931), Virginia State Senate
John D. Watkins (1828–1895), Louisiana State Senate
John Watkins (Virginia politician, born 1947), Virginia State Senate
Nathaniel W. Watkins (1796–1876), Missouri State Senate
Wes Watkins (born 1938), Oklahoma State Senate
William Wirt Watkins (1826–1898), Arkansas State Senate